Les Abysses is a 1963 French film directed by Nikos Papatakis. It was entered into the 1963 Cannes Film Festival. A violent and surrealistic mixture of farce and social commentary, its story was inspired by the real-life case of the Papin sisters.

Plot
Michèle and Marie-Louise (played by sisters Francine and Colette Bergé) are alone in the country house owned by their employers, the Lapeyres. They have not been paid any wages for three years, but the Lapeyres have promised them ownership of the chicken-house attached to their property; now, however, they intend to sell it entirely, leaving the girls with nothing. Michèle and Marie-Louise argue, fight and make up, meanwhile allowing the house to fall into ruin. Suddenly the Lapeyres return, earlier than expected. The girls rebel, disobeying the Lapeyres and tormenting them, especially their adult daughter Elisabeth, who appears to have a lesbian attachment to Marie-Louise, though she is married. Her husband Philippe arrives, bringing with him buyers for the house; Michèle and Marie-Louise are cowed into submission and serve coffee while the deal is signed. Once this is done, however, they break out again, first locking themselves in the kitchen quarters then attacking Elisabeth and Mme Lapeyre and murdering them with a kitchen knife and a flat iron. The film ends with a caption, making explicit reference to the Papin sisters.

Cast
 Francine Bergé as Michèle
 Colette Bergé as Marie-Louise
 Pascale de Boysson as Elisabeth Lapeyre
 Colette Régis as Mme. Lapeyre
 Paul Bonifas as Mons. Lapeyre
 Jean-Louis Le Goff as Philippe
 Lise Daubigny as Buyer
 Robert Benoît as Buyer
 Marcel Roche as Buyer

References

External links
 

1963 films
1960s French-language films
Maids in films
1963 crime films
Films directed by Nikos Papatakis
French crime films
1960s French films